Frederick Fell Publishers, Inc. is an independent American publishing company specializing in self-help books in genres such as business, entertainment, children, health, and cooking. Their motto is "A World of Books That Fill A Need".  

They have published titles such as Demystifying Business With Cookies And Elephants and So Eat, My Darling: A Guide to the Yiddish Kitchen. Many of their titles fall in the wide range of Fell’s Official Know-It-All Guide, with titles such as Fell’s Official Know-It-All Guide: How to Help Your Child Excel at Math and Fell’s Official Know-It-All Guide to Advanced Hypnotism. Fell has published books by notable authors like Og Mandino.  They also serve as wholesalers and distributors for several other publishers.

The publishing house was established by Frederick Fell in August 1943 on New York's Fourth Avenue, although the company is currently located in Hollywood, Florida. A protest over a book caused a bomb scare in 1952 when the founder received a ticking package in his office.

Notes

External links 
 Frederick Fell website
 Frederick Fell company records at Syracuse University

Book publishing companies based in Florida
Publishing companies established in 1943
Companies based in Broward County, Florida
Hollywood, Florida
1943 establishments in New York City